Hristo Botev, born Hristo Botyov Petkov (Христо Ботьов Петков;  – ), was a Bulgarian revolutionary and poet. Botev is considered by Bulgarians to be a symbolic historical figure and national hero. His poetry is a prime example of the literature of the Bulgarian National Revival, though he is considered to be ahead of his contemporaries in his political, philosophical, and aesthetic views.

Biography

Early years

Botev was born in Kalofer (some historians suggested that he was born in Karlovo and after several days was brought to Kalofer). His father, Botyo Petkov (1815–1869), was a teacher and one of the most significant figures of the late period of the Bulgarian National Revival towards the end of the Ottoman occupation. He had a strong influence on his son during the latter's youth.

In 1863, after completing his elementary education in Kalofer, Botev was sent by his father to a high school in Odessa. While there, he was deeply impressed by the work of the liberal Russian poets of the day. He left high school in 1865 and spent the next two years teaching in Odessa and Bessarabia. In the meantime he began creating his first poetic works and also established strong connections with the Russian and Polish revolutionary movement. His political views soon started to take shape.

Botev returned to Kalofer at the beginning of 1867, where he temporarily replaced his ill father as a teacher. In May, during the festivities celebrating Saints Cyril and Methodius (it was his father who first organized at the end of the school year such festivities which today correspond to Bulgaria's national holiday on 24 May), he made a public speech against the Ottoman authorities and the wealthy Bulgarians (whom he alleged were collaborating with the Ottomans). Botev was pressed into leaving the town as a result. He initially decided he would return to Russia, but due to lack of money instead opted for Romania, at the time an asylum for many Bulgarian exiles.

Exile
For some time he lived in an abandoned mill near Bucharest with Vasil Levski, the eventual leader of the Bulgarian insurgency, and the two of them initially became close friends. Later he would describe this period in his works.

From 1869 to 1871 Botev worked again as a teacher in Bessarabia, keeping close relations with the Bulgarian revolutionary movement and its leaders. In June 1871 he became editor of the revolutionary emigrant newspaper "Word of the Bulgarian Emigrants" (Duma na bulgarskite emigranti), where he began publishing his early poetic works. Imprisoned for some months, due to his close collaboration with the Russian revolutionaries, Botev started working for the "Liberty" (Svoboda) newspaper, edited by the eminent Bulgarian writer and revolutionary Lyuben Karavelov. In 1873 he also edited the satiric newspaper "Alarm clock" (Budilnik), where he published a number of feuilletons, aimed at those wealthy Bulgarians who did not take part in the revolutionary movement.

The Bulgarian revolutionary movement was put in danger with the capture of Vasil Levski by Ottoman authorities at the end of 1872. At the time Levski was the indisputable leader of the Bulgarian insurgency. He had established a network of revolutionary committees, supervised by the Bulgarian Central Revolutionary Committee (BCRC; In Bulgarian: БРЦК) located in Romania, which was tasked with preparing the Bulgarian revolutionaries for a future general uprising against Ottoman rule. Levski was brought to trial, sentenced to death by hanging and executed on 19 February 1873. His death was a serious blow to the morale of the revolutionary movement.

With Levski's death the BCRC split into two factions: Botev and his supporters, including Stefan Stambolov and Panayot Hitov backed the idea that preparations should be started for an immediate uprising, while the moderate revolutionaries, led by Lyuben Karavelov, thought that it was too early for such actions. Botev intended to start an uprising at the first possible moment, to take advantage of the international situation (the mounting tension between the Ottoman Empire on one side, and Serbia and Russia on the other), and because the revolutionary network, established by Levski, was still relatively intact and could take an active part in the preparations. The revolt in Bosnia and Herzegovina in 1875 inspired Botev and Stambolov to think that a rebellion should start soon in Bulgaria as well. They thought that the greater the turmoil in the Balkans, the more attention this would attract among the Great Powers. In the beginning of August 1875 Karavelov, already quite ill, stepped down as president of BCRC, and Botev was elected the new president. Thinking that the Bulgarian people were ever ready for a rebellion, he believed no careful preparations were needed. This resulted in the unsuccessful Stara Zagora Uprising of September 1875.

Death

In the beginning of 1876 the Bulgarian revolutionary émigrés in Romania were convinced that a general armed uprising of Bulgarians against Ottoman occupation was imminent. In April 1876 the émigré community in Bechet decided to organise an armed company to cross the Danube and take part in the expected uprising. The organisers (known within the movement as "apostles") of the planned insurgency in the 3rd Revolutionary District centred in Vratsa, had crossed into Romania to try to solicit additional support from the Bulgarian expat community. They met with Botev and convinced him that the planned guerrilla company would be best employed in their area. While fighters were being recruited and armed the news arrived that the insurgency had started prematurely.

The recruiters tried to secure an experienced Bulgarian guerrilla leader (known as voivoda) as a commander, but the two who were approached refused for political reasons. Thus, Botev himself, though lacking combat experience, took overall command of the company. Military expertise was provided by Nikola Voinovski (1849–1876), a graduate of the Emperor Nicholas Military Academy, who had previously held the rank of lieutenant in the Russian army. Due to time restraints and the need for secrecy the company did not undergo any formal combat training as a unit and had to rely on the individual fighting skills and experience of its members. The news of the uprising brought new urgency to the preparations and on 16 May 1876 (according to the Julian calendar) the 205-strong company was finally equipped and ready to deploy.

Botev devised an ingenious plan for crossing into Ottoman territory without immediately alerting either the Romanian or the Ottoman authorities. The rebels, disguised as gardeners, boarded in groups at several Romanian ports the Austro-Hungarian passenger steamship Radetzky. When the last group boarded at Bechet the rebels retrieved their concealed weapons and seized control of the ship. (This incident was later commemorated in a popular poem and song.) Botev confronted the captain Dagobert Engländer, stated his intent to reach the Ottoman side of the Danube, and explained the political motivation behind his actions. Engländer was so moved by Botev's impassioned speech that he rendered full support and even later refused to cooperate with the Ottoman authorities when they requested the use of his ship to pursue the rebel company.

Botev disembarked near Kozloduy and, together with every member of the company, ritualistically kissed the soil of the Homeland. As the rebels proceeded inland, they gradually realised, that, despite previous enthusiastic messages from the local "apostles," the 3rd Revolutionary District had not risen. Furthermore, due to the violent suppression of the uprisings proceeding elsewhere in the Bulgarian-populated territories, the entire Ottoman military machine, including regular army garrisons and irregular bashi-bazouks, was mobilised and thickly patrolling the area. Botev and his staff officers decided to press on to the comparative safety of the Vratsa Mountains while trying to rouse the Bulgarian population on their way. The population, intimidated by the overwhelming Ottoman military presence, refused to be incited into any overt sign of rebellion.

The company almost immediately became the focus of incessant bashi-bazouk attacks. Voinovski displayed some excellent defensive tactics helped by the still high morale and discipline of the company. On 18 May the massing bashi-bazouks caught up with the company in force, and Botev had to go to ground on the Milin Kamak Hill some 50 km from the Danube. Under Voinovski's skilful command the rebels managed to hold off the numerically superior Ottoman irregulars without taking serious casualties until the arrival of two Ottoman companies of regular troops. The regulars, using two light artillery pieces and their superior rifles, managed to inflict heavy casualties among the rebels from a safe distance, but their three attempts to follow up with frontal charges were repulsed by disciplined rebel fire. The Ottoman company lost about 30 killed or wounded. According to their custom the Ottomans ceased hostilities at nightfall, and the rebels split into two groups and managed to slip through the enemy lines to continue their forced march towards the mountains.

The next day passed without sighting the enemy, but at this point it was obvious that no local reinforcements could be expected. On the morning of 20 May Julian, sentries detected advancing bashi-bazouks and 5 companies of regular Ottoman troops. The men immediately took strong positions near Mount Okoltchitza. The defense was divided into two sectors, one commanded by Voinovski and the other by Botev. Soon two battalions of Ottoman regulars, led by Hassan Hairi Bey, assaulted Voinovski's fighters, while the bashi-bazouks concentrated on Botev's position. Voinovski's men, with concentrated fire, inflicted heavy losses on the advancing enemy and countered their attempts at encirclement. In their turn Botev's men repelled several bashi-bazouk attacks and drove the enemy back with a counterattack. 

At dusk the fighting died down as the Ottomans again withdrew for the night. The rebels lost about 10 killed, and many more were wounded in the day's fighting. It was at this point, at dusk on 20 May 1876 (in the Julian calendar, equivalent to 1 June 1876 in the Gregorian calendar, but traditionally commemorated on 2 June, see below), that a single bullet, most probably fired by a concealed Ottoman sharpshooter, hit Botev in the chest, killing him instantly. After the death of their leader and chief inspiration, the company suffered a serious drop in morale and began to disperse. Very few managed to evade capture or death. In all, 130 company members were killed and most of the others captured and imprisoned or executed.

Botev was survived by his wife, Veneta, daughter, Ivanka, and stepson, Dimitar.

National Icon

Botev's image was methodically built up as a revolutionary icon by 19th-century Post-Liberation intellectuals and authors, most notably by Zahari Stoyanov and Ivan Vazov. The more controversial aspects of his past, including his anarchist and early socialist views, were deliberately toned down in order not to offend Bourgeois sensibilities. Ironically, his past association with Russian anarchists helped the Communist propaganda of the second half of the 20th century to paint him as the pioneer of Bulgarian socialism and thus perpetuate his cult. Consequently, as with any super-exposed public figure with controversy in their past, over the years Botev has on numerous occasions become the target of sensationalist 'discoveries' predominantly in the tabloid press.

Literary works

In 1875 Botev published his poetic works in a book called "Songs and Poems", together with his close associate Bulgarian revolutionary poet and future politician and statesman, Stefan Stambolov. Botev's poetry reflected the sentiments of the poor people, filled with revolutionary ideas, struggling for their freedom against both foreign and domestic tyrants. His poetry was influenced by the Russian revolutionary democrats and the figures of the Paris Commune. Under this influence, Botev rose both as a poet and a revolutionary democrat. Many of his poems are imbued with revolutionary zeal and determination, such as My Prayer ("Moyata molitva"), At Farewell ("Na proshtavane"), Hajduks ("Haiduti"), In the Tavern ("V mehanata"), and Struggle ("Borba"). Others are romantic, balladic (Hadzhi Dimitar), even elegiac. Perhaps the greatest of his poems is The Hanging of Vasil Levski ("Obesvaneto na Vasil Levski").

Poems:

Legacy
In 1885 a commemoration committee was founded on the anniversary of Botev's death, 20 May/1 June. A monument was erected on the main square of Vratsa in 1890 in the presence of King Ferdinand. Some of the most prominent Bulgarians in the history of the newly independent country, such as Stefan Stambolov and Zahari Stoyanov, devoted much attention to Botev and his deeds for Bulgaria. Soon, Botev became a mythical figure in the Bulgarian National Revival, and is even today commemorated as one of the two greatest Bulgarian revolutionaries, alongside Vasil Levski.  A replica of the Danube steamship Radetzky which he commandeered that brought him to Bulgaria was rebuilt using money raised by over 1 million students in 1966 and is now preserved as a museum ship.

Every year at exactly 12:00 on 2 June, air raid sirens throughout Bulgaria sound for a minute to honour Hristo Botev and those who died for the freedom of Bulgaria. People stand still for 2 to 3 minutes until the sirens stop.

(Although according to the Gregorian calendar Hristo Botev died on 1 June 1876, his death is commemorated on 2 June. This tradition has arisen since Bulgarian adoption of the Gregorian calendar in 1916: the 20th-century gap of 13 days was added instead of the 19th-century gap of 12 days.)

The following are named after Hristo Botev:

 Botev Point and Botev Peak on Livingston Island in the South Shetland Islands
 The highest peak in Stara planina
 The city of Botevgrad
 Streets and boulevards in most Bulgarian cities
 Streets in some North Macedonian cities
 Streets and boulevards in many Romanian cities
 A number of schools and high schools
 Several football clubs – Botev Plovdiv, Botev Vratsa, Botev Galabovo and many more.
 Several football stadiums in Bulgaria
 Hristo Botev Radio - second channel of Bulgarian National Radio
 The International Botev Prize
 Asteroid (225238) 2009 QJ5, which was discovered on 23 August 2009, by F. Fratev – Zvezdno Obshtestvo Observatory (Bulgaria).
 An avenue in Kraków, Poland
 A street in Sarajevo, Bosnia and Herzegovina (renamed in 1995)
 A street in Chișinău, Republic of Moldova
 A street (Botevova) in Prague, Czech Republic (in a housing estate where all the streets are named after Bulgarian places and people)

References

External links 

 HristoBotev.com (Bulgarian)
 
 
 Hristo Botev, On Discord Among the Balkan Peoples, 1875
 2 June 1876 Daily Bleed Calendar reference page
 Kalofer.com Hristo Botev Museum in Kalofer
 bmc-bg.webbly.com First CD compilation of Botyov's Songs
 Topencharov, Vl. Khristo Botev. Paris, 1982
 

1848 births
1876 deaths
People from Kalofer
19th-century Bulgarian people
19th-century Bulgarian poets
Bulgarian revolutionaries
Bulgarian male poets
April Uprising of 1876
Bulgarian expatriates in Ukraine
Bulgarian expatriates in Moldova
Bulgarian expatriates in Romania
Romantic poets
19th-century male writers